Kallidaikurichi or Kalladaikurichi is a town on the right bank of the Thamiraparani river in Ambasamudram Taluk of Tirunelveli district in Tamil Nadu, a southern state of India.

Etymology 
'Kal + idai + kurichi' meaning exactly in Tamil, a village in the midst of hills. (In Sanskrit it has been translated in the 'Bhojanadi' (an astrological treatise)  as 'Shilaa - madhya - Hariswam'. In the Thamrabarani Mahatmya of the Matsya Purama, it has been translated as 'Shila - Shalipuram').

Geography

Thamiraparni River
The Thamiraparni river flows through Kallidaikurichi. Originating from the Pothigai nearby, it flows down to Bay of Bengal after traveling for about 125 kilometers. In the hills are a number of waterfalls, such as Courtallam Falls, Banatheertham Falls, Agasthiar Falls, and Manimuthar Falls.

Climate  
Like most parts of Tamil Nadu, the climate here is rather hot, except during the rainy season of the November/December months. During summer strong gusty winds are frequent.

Flora and Fauna  
This southern end of the Western Ghats, is full of flora and fauna. Kalakkad Mundanthurai Range is a wild life park under Project Tiger

Demographics

Population

Government and politics

Subdivisions 
Kallidaikurichi seems to have had the following subdivisions - Madakkurichi, Velankurichi, Cherakumaran and Kallidaikurichi.

Economy 
Kallidaikurichi and appalam, murukku are almost synonymous. Appalam making is a major cottage industry here. It is nationally known for its quality and taste and is sent almost all over India.

Agriculture 
Rice is the main crop here. Other crops are groundnut (peanuts), chilies (red pepper) and cotton, though these are seen less frequently nowadays. 
 
The tea plantations are operated by the Bombay Burmah Trading Corporation Ltd on forest lands leased by the government of Tamil Nadu. There are three tea estates within the Manjolai area.

Culture/Cityscape

Landmarks 
Velakurichi Adheenam
Thiruvavaduthurai Adheenam
Sri Kumarar koil
Sri Manenthiappar Temple
Sri Kulasekaramudayar Temple
Sri Pagazhikuththar Temple

Tourist Attractions 
Kallidaikurichi's Hindu shrines , have high-rise gopurams

Literature

Music and films 
Muthuswami Dikshitar, the carnatic composer, whose songs abound with geographic and iconographic references, sings of the curative properties of the river Thamiraparani.

Transport

By Air  
Nearby airports are Tuticorin Domestic Airport in Tamil Nadu, about 90km away; and Trivandrum International Airport in Kerala, about 145 km away.Madurai International Airport 170 km

Rail  
Kallidaikurichi railway station is easily reachable to Tirunelveli, Tenkasi, Sengottai.

By Road  
This town is located about 70 km north of Kanyakumari (Cape Comerin). The twin cities of Tirunelveli and Palayamkottai are about 35 km away.

Education
One of the educational institutions here was established over 160 years ago. Originally called the George IV English Middle School, it was later renamed the Tilak Vidyalaya after the independence of India.

Lakshmipathi Middle School, Kallidaikurichi was launched in 1939 under the legacy of the late headmaster A Ramalingam. Its students are renowned for their high positions and have a global presence. This school's primary medium of instruction is Tamil and the student teacher ratio is 33:1. The school tries to provide best learning environment.

The school provides education to students from class 1 to 8. This school's student strength is approximately 302. 525 books are there in the library of this school.

The school has given exceptional results in the academic sphere and its students have excelled in extra co-curricular activities. The percentage of students passing the exam is 100% with 78% scoring first grade.

External links

Cities and towns in Tirunelveli district